Thout 25 - Coptic Calendar - Thout 27

The twenty-sixth day of the Coptic month of Thout, the first month of the Coptic year. On a common year, this day corresponds to September 23, of the Julian Calendar, and October 6, of the Gregorian Calendar. This day falls in the Coptic season of Akhet, the season of inundation.

Commemorations

Other commemorations 

 The Annunciation of the Birth of Saint John the Baptist to Zachariah the Priest

References 

Days of the Coptic calendar